Georges L. Mouyémé-Elong (born 15 April 1971) is a Cameroonian former professional footballer who played as forward. At club level, he played for Saint-Lô, Troyes, Angers, and Paris FC in France, for FC Homburg and Eintracht Trier in Germany, for Shenyang Ginde in China, and for AO Chania in Greece.

For the Cameroon national team he participated at the 1994 FIFA World Cup.

References

1971 births
Living people
Association football forwards
Cameroonian footballers
Cameroon international footballers
FC Saint-Lô Manche players
ES Troyes AC players
Angers SCO players
FC 08 Homburg players
SV Eintracht Trier 05 players
Guangzhou City F.C. players
AO Chania F.C. players
Paris FC players
1994 FIFA World Cup players
1996 African Cup of Nations players
Cameroonian expatriate footballers
Cameroonian expatriate sportspeople in France
Expatriate footballers in France
Cameroonian expatriate sportspeople in Germany
Expatriate footballers in Germany
Cameroonian expatriate sportspeople in China
Expatriate footballers in China